Designated in 1975, the Gee Creek Wilderness is a  wilderness area lying mostly within Polk County in the U.S. state of Tennessee. The northeasternmost section of Gee Creek extends into Monroe County. Gee Creek Wilderness is the smallest wilderness in the Cherokee National Forest.

References

IUCN Category Ib
Wilderness areas of the Appalachians
Protected areas of Monroe County, Tennessee
Protected areas of Polk County, Tennessee
Wilderness areas of Tennessee
Protected areas established in 1975
1975 establishments in Tennessee